Coleophora kalmiella is a moth of the family Coleophoridae. It is found in Canada, including Nova Scotia.

The larvae feed on the leaves of Kalmia species. They create a composite leaf case.

References

kalmiella
Moths described in 1936
Moths of North America